Beatrice Gladys Lillie, Lady Peel (29 May 1894 – 20 January 1989), known as Bea Lillie, was a Canadian-born British actress, singer and comedic performer.

She began to perform as a child with her mother and sister. She made her West End debut in 1914 and soon gained notice in revues and light comedies, becoming known for her parodies of old-fashioned, flowery performing styles and absurd songs and sketches. She debuted in New York in 1924 and two years later starred in her first film, continuing to perform in both the US and UK. She was associated with revues staged by André Charlot and works of Noël Coward and Cole Porter, and frequently was paired with Gertrude Lawrence, Bert Lahr and Jack Haley.

During World War II, Lillie was an inveterate entertainer of the troops. She won a Tony Award in 1953 for her revue An Evening with Beatrice Lillie.

Early life and career

Lillie was born in Toronto to Irish-born John Lillie and his wife Lucie Ann (née Shaw). She had an elder sister, Muriel (1893–1973), at one time an aspiring concert pianist who later played the piano at silent movie houses, married firstly to the Egyptologist, stage designer and writer Arthur Weigall, and secondly to Sir Brian Dean Paul, 6th Baronet of Rodborough. Her father was a cigar seller at the time of Lillie's birth, later working as a guard at the Toronto city jail. He had been a soldier in the British Army stationed in India, and on his honourable discharge went to Toronto rather than returning to Ireland. Lucie Ann Lillie (who had changed her name from "Lucy Ann"), who had "a modest reputation as a concert singer" was the daughter of a Manchester clothing retailer who had retired to a farm outside Toronto.

Lillie performed in Ontario towns as part of a family trio with her mother and older sister, Muriel, her father running the family home in Toronto as a boarding house in their absence. Eventually, her mother took the girls to London, England, where she made her West End début in the 1914 show Not Likely! Lillie followed this with about a dozen London shows and musical revues until 1922. In her revues, Lillie developed her sketches, songs and parodies. These won her lavish praise from The New York Times after her 1924 Broadway début in André Charlot's Revue of 1924, starring Gertrude Lawrence.

In some of her best known bits, she solemnly parodied the flowery performing style of earlier decades, mining such songs as "There Are Fairies at the Bottom of Our Garden" and "Mother Told Me So" for every double entendre. Other numbers ("Get Yourself a Geisha" and "Snoops the Lawyer") showcased her exquisite sense of the absurd. Her performing in such comedy routines as "One Dozen Double Damask Dinner Napkins", (in which an increasingly flummoxed matron attempts to purchase said napkins) earned her the frequently used sobriquet of "Funniest Woman in the World".

In 1926, she returned to New York City to perform. While in the United States, she starred in her first film, Exit Smiling (1927), opposite fellow Canadian Jack Pickford, the younger brother of Mary Pickford. This was followed by a small role in The Show of Shows (1929) and her only starring role in a sound feature film, Are You There? (1930). After a 1927 tour on the Orpheum Circuit, Lillie returned to Broadway in Vaudeville at the Palace Theatre in 1928 and performed there frequently after that.

Later career
From the late 1920s until the approach of World War II, Lillie repeatedly crossed the Atlantic to perform on both continents. She played at the London Palladium in 1928. On stage, she was long associated with the works of Noël Coward, beginning with This Year of Grace (1928) and giving the first public performance of "Mad Dogs and Englishmen" in Coward's The Third Little Show (1931). Cole Porter and others wrote songs for her. With Bobby Clark, she appeared in London and New York in Walk a Little Faster, in 1935 she starred on Broadway in At Home Abroad, and in 1936 she starred in New York in The Show Is On with Bert Lahr.

She returned to Broadway in 1939 in Set to Music and in 1944 in Seven Lively Arts. The same year, Lillie appeared in the film On Approval. Other Broadway appearances included Inside USA (1948), An Evening with Beatrice Lillie (1952) (Broadway and London), Ziegfeld Follies of 1957, Auntie Mame (1958) (Broadway and London) and High Spirits (1964). Her few other film appearances included a cameo role as a revivalist in Around the World in 80 Days (1956) and as Mrs. Meers (a white slaver) in Thoroughly Modern Millie (1967), her last film.

After seeing An Evening with Beatrice Lillie, critic Ronald Barker wrote "Other generations may have their Mistinguett and their Marie Lloyd. We have our Beatrice Lillie, and seldom have we seen such a display of perfect talent." Sheridan Morley noted in the Oxford Dictionary of National Biography that "Lillie's great talents were the arched eyebrow, the curled lip, the fluttering eyelid, the tilted chin, the ability to suggest, even in apparently innocent material, the possible double entendre".

Marriage and children
Lillie was married, on 20 January 1920 at the church of St. Paul, Drayton Bassett, Fazeley, Staffordshire, England, to Robert Peel, son of Sir Robert Peel, 4th Baronet, and at the time a used car salesman. The Peel family had "fallen on hard times", and Peel "had little else to offer besides the title of 5th baronet". He inherited the title on his father's death in 1925. Peel was an enthusiastic gambler and, due to his limited means, he generally used his wife's money; on their honeymoon in Monte Carlo, he lost all their money gambling.

Peel had expensive tastes, and the couple were entirely dependent on her theatrical income throughout their marriage. Following the marriage, she was known in private life as Lady Peel. She eventually separated from her husband, but the couple never divorced. He died in 1934, aged 35. Their only child, Sir Robert Peel, 6th Baronet (1920–1942), was killed in action aboard  in Colombo Harbour, Ceylon (present-day Sri Lanka) in 1942.

During World War II, Lillie was an inveterate entertainer of the troops. Before she went on stage one day, she learned that her son was killed in action. She refused to postpone the performance, saying "I'll cry tomorrow." In 1948, while touring in the show Inside USA, she met singer/actor John Philip Huck. He was a former US Marine, almost three decades younger, who became her friend and companion for the rest of their lives, and she boosted his career. As Lillie's mental abilities declined at the end of her career, she relied more and more on Huck, whose intentions and loyalty to her were viewed with suspicion by her friends. She suffered a stroke in the mid-1970s, and in 1977, a conservator was appointed over her property; she retired to England.

Death
Lillie died in 1989, aged 94, at Henley-on-Thames. Huck died of a heart attack the next day, and the two were buried in the churchyard of St Margaret's in Harpsden, Oxfordshire, near Henley-on-Thames.

Filmography

Features
 Exit Smiling (1927) as Violet
 The Show of Shows (1929) as Performer in 'Recitations' Number
 Are You There? (1930) as Shirley Travis 
 Dr. Rhythm (1938) as Mrs. Lorelei Dodge-Blodgett
 On Approval (1944) as Maria Wislack
 Around the World in 80 Days (1956) as London revivalist leader
 Thoroughly Modern Millie (1967) as Mrs. Meers

Short subjects
 Beatrice Lillie (1929) as Herself
 Beatrice Lillie and Her Boyfriends (1930) Vitaphone Varieties short released 15 May 1930
 Broadway Highlights No. 1 (1935) as Herself
 Broadway Highlights No. 2 (1935) as Herself

Stage appearances

 Not Likely (1914) (London)
 5064 Gerrard (1915) (London)
 Samples (1916) (London)
 Some (1916) (London)
 Cheep (1917) (London)
 Tabs (1918) (London)
 Bran Pie (1919) (London)
 Oh, Joy! (1919) (London)
 Now and Then (1921) (London)
 Pot Luck (1921) (London)
 The Nine O'Clock Revue (1922) (London)
 Andre Charlot's Revue of 1924 (1924) (Broadway)
 Andre Charlot's Revue of 1926 (1925) (Broadway and US national tour)
 Oh, Please (1926) (Broadway)
 She's My Baby (1928) (Broadway)
 This Year of Grace (1928) (Broadway)
 Charlot's Masquerade (1930) (London)
 The Third Little Show (1931) (Broadway)
 Too True to Be Good (1932) (Broadway)
 Walk a Little Faster (1932) (Broadway)
 Please (1933) (London)
 At Home Abroad (1935) (Broadway)
 The Show Is On (1936) (Broadway)
 Happy Returns (1938) (London)
 Set to Music (1939) (Broadway)
 All Clear (1939) (London)
 Big Top (1942) (London)
 Seven Lively Arts (1944) (Broadway)
 Better Late (1946) (London)
 Inside USA (1948) (Broadway)
 An Evening with Beatrice Lillie (1952) (Broadway and London)
 Ziegfeld Follies of 1957 (1957) (Broadway)
 Auntie Mame (1958) (replacement for Greer Garson) (Broadway and London)
 A Late Evening with Beatrice Lillie (1960) (Edinburgh Festival)
 High Spirits (1964) (Broadway)

Radio and television
She was the star of three radio programs:
 The Beatrice Lillie Show on NBC 4 January – 28 June 1935
 The Flying Red Horse Tavern on CBS 7 February – 22 May 1936
 Broadway Merry-Go-Round on the Blue Network 6 January – 28 July 1937

In 1950 she appeared on The Star Spangled Revue with Bob Hope. (This includes the "One Dozen Double Damask Dinner Napkins" sketch.)

Awards and honours
 1945: New York Drama Critics Award for Best Femme Performance in a Musical – Seven Lively Arts
 1948: New York Drama Critics Award for Best Femme Performance in a Musical – Inside USA
 1953: Special Tony Award – An Evening with Beatrice Lillie
 1954: Sarah Siddons Award
 1958: Tony Award for Best Leading Actress in a Musical – Ziegfeld Follies of 1957 (nominee)
 1964: Tony Award for Best Leading Actress in a Musical – High Spirits (nominee)

For her contributions to film, in 1960 Beatrice Lillie was awarded a star on the Hollywood Walk of Fame at 6404 Hollywood Blvd. Her portrait, painted by Neysa McMein about 1948 or 1949, is in the collection of The Royal Central School of Speech and Drama in England.

References

Sources

 Laffey, Bruce. Beatrice Lillie: The Funniest Woman in the World, Wynwood Press (1989) 
 Lillie, Beatrice, with John Philip Huck and James Brough, Every Other Inch a Lady (Garden City, New York: Doubleday, 1972).

External links

 
 
  Records in the Theatre Archive at the University of Bristol of stage performances by Beatrice Lillie
 
 Beatrice Lillie papers, 1911–1995, held by the Billy Rose Theatre Division, New York Public Library for the Performing Arts
 

1894 births
1989 deaths
20th-century British actresses
Actresses from London
Actresses from Toronto
Canadian emigrants to the United Kingdom
British film actresses
British musical theatre actresses
British silent film actresses
British stage actresses
Entertainments National Service Association personnel
Musicians from Toronto
Singers from London
Deaths from Alzheimer's disease
Deaths from dementia in England
Donaldson Award winners
Special Tony Award recipients
Vaudeville performers
Bisexual actresses
20th-century British women singers